The tapertail, Radiicephalus elongatus, is a species of marine fish found in the central and eastern Atlantic and eastern Pacific. It is the only known species in the genus Radiicephalus and the family Radiicephalidae.

References

External links
 

Discover Life

Lampriformes
Monotypic fish genera
Fish described in 1917